The Autopista AP-41 is a proposed highway in central Spain.  The first section from Madrid to Toledo has been completed.  The road is due to follow the N-401 and N-420.  It passes via the Ciudad Real.  The road duplicates the Autovía A-4.

References

Autopistas and autovías in Spain
Transport in Andalusia
Transport in the Community of Madrid
Transport in Castilla–La Mancha